Saidi Ndikumana (born 24 May 1986 in Bujumbura) is a Burundian defender who played with AS Rangers in the Burundi Second Division.

International career

International goals
Scores and results list Burundi's goal tally first.

References

External links
 

1986 births
Living people
Burundian footballers
Burundi international footballers
Association football defenders